Selah Sue is the eponymous debut album of Belgian musician and songwriter Selah Sue, released on 4 March 2011 in Belgium. It peaked at number one on the Belgium Albums Chart, and also charted in the Netherlands, France, Poland and Switzerland. The album has sold more than 720,000 copies to date, and has been certified double platinum by the UPFI in France.

Track listing

Notes
  denotes co-producer

Charts

Weekly charts

Year-end charts

Certifications

Release history

References

External links
 

2011 debut albums
Because Music albums
Selah Sue albums
European Border Breakers Award-winning albums